William Lucius Storrs (March 25, 1795 – June 25, 1861) was a U.S. Representative from Connecticut, brother of Henry Randolph Storrs.

Born in Middletown, Connecticut, Storrs was graduated from Yale College in 1814.
He studied law and was admitted to the bar in Whitestown, New York, in 1817.
He returned to Connecticut the same year and commenced practice in Middletown.
He served as a member of the state house of representatives 1827-1829 and again in 1834.
He served as speaker in 1834.

Storrs was elected as an Anti-Jacksonian to the Twenty-first and Twenty-second Congresses (March 4, 1829 – March 3, 1833).
He was not a candidate for renomination in 1832.

Storrs was elected as a Whig to the Twenty-sixth Congress and served from March 1839 until his resignation in June 1840.
He was appointed associate judge of the Connecticut Supreme Court in 1840 and promoted to chief justice in 1856. He served as chief justice until his death.
Professor of law in the Wesleyan University at Middletown 1841-1846.
Professor of law at Yale College in 1846 and 1847.
He was elected as a member to the American Philosophical Society in 1848.

He died in Hartford, Connecticut, June 25, 1861.
He was interred in Old North Cemetery.

References

External links 
 

1795 births
1861 deaths
Wesleyan University faculty
Justices of the Connecticut Supreme Court
Chief Justices of the Connecticut Supreme Court
Yale Law School alumni
Connecticut Whigs
National Republican Party members of the United States House of Representatives from Connecticut
Whig Party members of the United States House of Representatives
19th-century American politicians
Yale College alumni
19th-century American judges